Domaniów may refer to the following places in Poland:
Domaniów, Lower Silesian Voivodeship (south-west Poland)
Domaniów, Masovian Voivodeship (east-central Poland)